Three Rings Design, Inc. was an online game developer that was founded on March 30, 2001, by Daniel James and Michael Bayne.  The company was named in honor of the Three Rings of the Elven-kings in Tolkien mythology.

History 
The company's first product was Yohoho! Puzzle Pirates, a skill-based open-world MMOG in which player is tasked with action puzzle games corresponding to tasks of piracy, crafting and carousing. The player joins a crew to sail with other players and participates in a player-driven trading economy.

The company's second product, released December 1, 2006, was a western-themed Tactical Multi Player game named Bang! Howdy.

Whirled, the company's third virtual world, was a player created content platform using Adobe Flash and html5. Whirled allowed creators to list virtual goods such as avatars, in-world toys or game content and earn real-world currency from the system. Whirled went into beta testing in 2008 and became unavailable in April 2017.

Three Rings created a number of Flash games for Whirled, notably Corpse Craft which was later released on iPad. In 2010 the studio tested Facebook games including The Everything Game, a collectible card game.

Spiral Knights was the company's fourth MMOG, launched in April 2011. Spiral Knights is an action adventure world where players cooperate to defeat the denizens of The Clockworks, a mysterious ever-changing maze.

In 2011 the studio launched Doctor Who: Worlds in Time, in partnership with BBC Worldwide.

Three Rings was an independent developer from its founding in 2001 until 2011 when it was acquired by SEGA of Japan. The company had been funded by the founders, revenue from Puzzle Pirates and other games, and investors including True Ventures. Following the acquisition, the studio operated as a label within SEGA until March 2016, when SEGA reduced its San Francisco R&D staff.

Puzzle Pirates and Spiral Knights remain operational under the banner of Grey Havens, a small crew that seeks to keep the games operational for as long as feasible.

Games
 Yohoho! Puzzle Pirates
 Bang! Howdy
 Whirled (open beta as of March 25, 2008, closed April 2017)
 Corpse Craft: Incident at Weardd Academy
 Spiral Knights
 Doctor Who: Worlds in Time

Game Gardens and open source code
Shortly after Puzzle Pirates' launch Three Rings Design open-sourced substantial parts of the underlying technology for creating multi-user virtual worlds, available on GitHub.  The company  created a site called Game Gardens, which hosted free tools for creating and playing Java games using these libraries, a precursor to Whirled, which allowed players to upload client and server-side AS3 (Adobe Flash) code to create complex multi-player games.

References

External links
 Three Rings Design site (Broken website)

 
Sega divisions and subsidiaries
Defunct video game companies of the United States
Video game companies established in 2001
Video game companies disestablished in 2016
2011 mergers and acquisitions
Video game development companies
Defunct companies based in the San Francisco Bay Area
2001 establishments in California
2016 disestablishments in California